Peter Holmes (1675–1732) of Peterfield was an Irish High Sheriff and MP in the Irish House of Commons.

He was the son of George Holmes of New Hall, Co Kildare, Clerk of the Faculties jointly with his father.

Peter was High Sheriff of King's County for 1707 and elected Member of Parliament for Banagher in 1713. He was MP for Athlone from 1727 to 1731.

He married twice; firstly Lucy, the daughter of William Sprigg of Cloonivoe, King's County, with whom he had a son Robert, and secondly, Anne, widow of both Richard Malone and William L'Estrange.

References

 

1675 births
1732 deaths
Irish MPs 1713–1714
Irish MPs 1727–1760
High Sheriffs of King's County
Members of the Parliament of Ireland (pre-1801) for King's County constituencies
Members of the Parliament of Ireland (pre-1801) for Athlone